The Marne de Flize is a geologic formation in France. It preserves fossils dating back to the Toarcian stage of the Jurassic period.

Description 
The finely bedded blue-grey shales contain limestone lenses up to one metre in thickness La Croisette. The Marne de Flize is referred to the early Toarcian (Tenuicostatum and Serpentinum zones according to Mouterde, 1980). It is therefore coeval with the Posidonia Shale of southern Germany.

Fossil content 
The following fossils were reported from the formation:

Vertebrates 
Reptiles
 cf. Dorygnathus sp.
 Ichthyosauria indet.
Fish
 Osteichthyes indet.

Invertebrates 
 Crustacea indet.
 Bivalvia indet.
 Teuthidea indet.

Ammonites
 Dactylioceras sp.
 Harpoceras sp.

Flora 
 Plantae indet.

See also 
 List of fossiliferous stratigraphic units in France
 Toarcian turnover
 Toarcian formations

 Marne di Monte Serrone, Italy
 Calcare di Sogno, Italy
 Posidonia Shale, Lagerstätte in Germany
 Ciechocinek Formation, Germany and Poland
 Krempachy Marl Formation, Poland & Slovakia
 Lava Formation, Lithuania
 Budoš Limestone, Montenegro
 Azilal Group, North Africa
 Whitby Mudstone, England
 Fernie Formation, Alberta and British Columbia
 Poker Chip Shale
 Whiteaves Formation, British Columbia
 Navajo Sandstone, Utah
 Los Molles Formation, Argentina
 Mawson Formation, Antarctica
 Kandreho Formation, Madagascar
 Kota Formation, India
 Cattamarra Coal Measures, Australia

References

Bibliography 
 

Geologic formations of France
Jurassic System of Europe
Jurassic France
Toarcian Stage
Limestone formations
Shale formations
Paleontology in France
Formations